Tepati is a beach village in Tautira District on the south coast of Tahiti.

Towns and villages in Tahiti